The 1964 Tennessee Volunteers football team (variously "Tennessee", "UT" or the "Vols") represented the University of Tennessee in the 1964 NCAA University Division football season. Playing as a member of the Southeastern Conference (SEC), the team was led by head coach Doug Dickey, in his first year, and played their home games at Neyland Stadium in Knoxville, Tennessee. They finished the season with a record of four wins, five losses and one tie (4–5–1 overall, 1–5–1 in the SEC). The Volunteers offense scored 80 points while the defense allowed 121 points.

Schedule

Team players drafted into the NFL

Awards and honors
 Steve DeLong, Outland Trophy

References

Tennessee
Tennessee Volunteers football seasons
Tennessee Volunteers football